The men's kumite 60 kilograms competition at the 2010 Asian Games in Guangzhou, China was held on 25 November 2010 at the Guangdong Gymnasium.

Schedule
All times are China Standard Time (UTC+08:00)

Results
Legend
H — Won by hansoku
K — Won by kiken

Main bracket

Final

Top half

Bottom half

Repechage

References

External links
Official website

Men's kumite 60 kg